Oncocalyx is a genus of flowering plants belonging to the family Loranthaceae.

Its native range is Ethiopia to Southern Africa, and the Arabian Peninsula.

Species
Species:

Oncocalyx angularis 
Oncocalyx bolusii 
Oncocalyx cordifolius 
Oncocalyx doberae 
Oncocalyx fischeri 
Oncocalyx ghikae 
Oncocalyx glabratus 
Oncocalyx kelleri 
Oncocalyx quinquenervis 
Oncocalyx sulfureus 
Oncocalyx ugogensis 
Oncocalyx welwitschii

References

Loranthaceae
Loranthaceae genera